Saint-Jean-de-Laur (Languedocien: Sent Joan de Laur) is a commune in the Lot department in south-western France.

See also
Communes of the Lot department

References

Saintjeandelaur